Linda Klímová (born 14 April 1988) is a Czech curler.

Teams

Women's

Mixed doubles

Personal life
Klímová is from a family of Czech curlers. Her father is curler and coach Radek Klima, her brother is Lukáš Klíma and her uncle (Radek's brother) is Tomas Klima

She started curing in 2004 at the age of 16.

References

External links

  (web archive)
Klímová Linda (CC ZBRASLAV) - Player statistics (all games with his/her participation) - Czech Curling Association

Living people
1988 births

Czech female curlers
Competitors at the 2011 Winter Universiade